This is a list of active and extinct volcanoes in Korea.

See also 
 Lists of volcanoes

References 

 
Korea
Volcanoes